Chandan Singh is an Indian politician from Bihar. He was elected to the Lok Sabha, the lower house of the Parliament of India from Nawada Parliamentary constituency in the 2019 Indian general election. He contested as a member of the Lok Janshakti Party. He is member of Standing Committee on Industry and Consultative Committee, Ministry of Road Transport and Highways in Indian Parliament.

He was one of the 5 MP of LJP who replaced Chirag Paswan with Pashupati Nath Paras as LJP party president.

References

External links

 
 Chandan Singh on Twitter
 Chandan Singh on Telegram

1985 births
Living people
India MPs 2019–present
Lok Sabha members from Bihar
People from Patna district
Lok Janshakti Party politicians